Jerome Farah, is an Australian rapper. Farah co-wrote and co-produced "Waiting" with Kian before releasing his debut single in 2020.

Early life
Jerome Farah is the son of a Lebanese father and a Zimbabwean mother and grew up in suburban Melbourne.

Originally a dancer, Farah transited into music, collaborating with the likes of Adrian Eagle, Baker Boy and Dallas Woods and Kian.

Music career

2018-present
In 2018, Farah co-wrote and co-produced "Waiting" with Kian which won Most Performed Australian Work of the Year and Most Performed Alternative Work of the Year at the APRA Music Awards of 2020.

On 26 June 2020, Farah released his debut single "I Can't Breathe". The song discusses racism and police brutality. On 19 July 2020, Farah performed the song on the series premiere of Australian live music program The Sound.

Discography

Singles

As lead artist

As featured artist

Guest appearances

Awards and nominations

ARIA Music Awards
The ARIA Music Awards is an annual awards ceremony that recognises excellence, innovation, and achievement across all genres of Australian music. They commenced in 1987. 

! 
|-
| 2022
| Pip Norman, Rob Amoruso, Morgan Jones, Carl Dimataga, Willie Tafa & Jerome Farah for Baker Boy – Gela
| Producer – Best Produced Album
| 
| 
|}

APRA Awards
The APRA Awards are held in Australia and New Zealand by the Australasian Performing Right Association to recognise songwriting skills, sales and airplay performance by its members annually.

! 
|-
| rowspan="3"| 2019
| rowspan="2"|  "Marryuna" by Baker Boy (with Danzal Baker, Dion Brownfield & Yirrmal Marika)
| Song of the Year
| 
| 
|-
| rowspan="2"| Urban Work of the Year
| 
| rowspan="2"| 
|-
| "Mr La Di Da Di" by Baker Boy (Danzal Baker, Dion Brownfield & Dallas Woods)
| 
|-
| rowspan="3"| 2020
| rowspan="2"| "Waiting" (with Kian)
| Most Performed Australian Work of the Year
| rowspan="2" 
| rowspan="3"| 
|-
| Most Performed Alternative Work of the Year
|-
| "Cool as Hell" (Danzal Baker, Carl Dimataga, Jesse Ferris, Morgan Jones, Brendan Tuckerman, Dallas Woods)
| Most Performed Urban Work of the Year
| 
|-
| 2021 
| "Meditjin" (Danzal Baker, Jess Bourke, Dion Brownfield, Jerome Farah, Dallas Woods)
| Song of the Year
| 
| 
|-
| 2022
| "Vibrate"
| Most Performed R&B / Soul Work
| 
| 
|}

J Awards
The J Awards are an annual series of Australian music awards that were established by the Australian Broadcasting Corporation's youth-focused radio station Triple J. They commenced in 2005.

! 
|-
| J Awards of 2021
| "Concrete Jungle Fever" (directed by Sanjay De Silva)
| Australian Video of the Year
| 
|

Rolling Stone Australia Awards
The Rolling Stone Australia Awards are awarded annually in January or February by the Australian edition of Rolling Stone magazine for outstanding contributions to popular culture in the previous year.

! 
|-
| 2021
| Jerome Farah
| Best New Artist
| 
| 
|-

Vanda & Young Global Songwriting Competition
The Vanda & Young Global Songwriting Competition is an annual competition that "acknowledges great songwriting whilst supporting and raising money for Nordoff-Robbins" and is coordinated by Albert Music and APRA AMCOS. It commenced in 2009.

! 
|-
| 2021
| "Mikey Might"
| Vanda & Young Global Songwriting Competition
| style="background:silver;"| 2nd
|
|-

UK Music Video Awards
The UK Music Video Awards is an annual celebration of creativity, technical excellence and innovation in music video and moving image for music. They commenced in 2008.

! 
|-
| 2021
| Jerome Farah - "Concrete Jungle Fever"
| Best Performance in a Video
| 
|

References

21st-century Australian musicians
APRA Award winners
Living people
Singers from Melbourne
Singer-songwriters
21st-century Australian male musicians
Australian people of Zimbabwean descent
Australian people of Lebanese descent
Year of birth missing (living people)